Microscope (stylized as MICroscope) is the debut studio album by Riz Ahmed, released under the moniker Riz MC. It was originally released on 31 January 2011. It was re-released on Tru Thoughts on 18 June 2012.

Critical reception

At Metacritic, which assigns a weighted average score out of 100 to reviews from mainstream critics, the album received an average score of 74, based on 6 reviews, indicating "generally favorable reviews".

Josh Langhoff of PopMatters wrote, "The beats by Lazersonic and Redinho churn and pop, squeal and squirm, and Riz tries to take the edge off by cracking jokes." Adam Kennedy of BBC commented that "while his flow isn't the most natural on the block, the warts'n'all streams of consciousness refuse to exclude anything on his mind."

Track listing

References

External links
 

2011 debut albums
Riz Ahmed albums